Chilangolandia is a 2021 Mexican crime comedy film written and directed by Carlos Santos in his directorial debut. It stars Liliana Arriaga, Priscila Arias, Silverio Palacios, Pierre Louis and Moises Iván Mora.

Synopsis 
'Chilangolandia' is a place where many things happen and many stories are told, like that of Ramiro, the taxi driver. He is convinced that his life will change when his nephew "El Chulo" becomes the next soccer star by testing himself in the basic forces. On the other side of the city, Carmen and Miguel – a woman desperately seeking to improve her economic situation in the company of her bossy husband – will receive a suitcase with 10 million pesos by mistake. The owner of the suitcase will seek to recover his money while Carmen and her husband must pay their debts and spend the money before they are caught.

Cast 
The actors participating in this film are:

 Aarón Aguilar as Miguel
 Priscila Arias as "La Beba"
 Liliana Arriaga as Carmen
 Pierre Louis as "El Chulo"
 Silverio Palacios as Ramiro
 Moisés Iván Mora as Pollo
 Ariana Dugarte as Gaby
 Francisco Denis as Carlos Sotomayor
 Carlos Corona as Deputy Fonseca
 Emmanuel Orenday as "El Gusano"
 Luis Felipe Tovar as "La Rata Hernández"
 Analy Castro as Furniture Store Cashier

Release 
Chilangolandia premiered on September 16, 2021, in Mexican theaters. It premiered internationally on December 25, 2021, on Amazon Prime Video.

Reception 
In its first weekend, the film debuted in second place on the billboards, attracting 206.6 thousand theatergoers and grossing $13 million pesos. At the end of the year, Chilangolandia is positioned as the third most viewed Mexican film of 2021, which collected 35.2 million pesos with 595 thousand viewers.

References

External links 

 

2021 films
2021 comedy films
Mexican crime comedy films
Mexican satirical films
2020s Spanish-language films
2020s Mexican films
Films set in Mexico City
Films shot in Mexico City
Films about criminals
Films about sportspeople
2021 directorial debut films